The Down Easter or Downeaster was a type of 19th-century sailing ship built in Maine, and used largely in the California grain trade. It was a modification of the clipper ship using a similar bow but with better cargo handling. It achieved a balance between speed and tonnage such that it made the wheat trade between California and Great Britain competitive with east coast grain trade via steam ship. It could make the trip between San Francisco and Liverpool in 100 days, despite rounding Cape Horn and crossing the equator twice.  A more unusual name for the rig was shipentine.

History 
Arthur Sewall had begun building very large Down Easters in 1869. Beginning with the launch of the Rappahannock, they built a series of 300 foot, 3,000 tonners. The Rappahannock was a full-rigged 3-masted ship, and the Sewalls realized that at this size a fourth mast was needed to make the rig manageable. Subsequent vessels were rigged as 4-masted barks, with a fore-and-aft rigged fourth mast. These were at the limit of wooden ship size, and for this reason they switched to the British practice of building with steel. The after mast was called the jigger, and since it was fore-and-aft rigged like a bark's mizzen, these vessels were commonly called four masted barks.
The history of the name Downeaster derives from the fact that these ships were designed for trade between Maine and Boston where the ships generally sailed downwind and easterly on the trip to Maine.

Other uses 
"Down Easter" may also refer to a type of power fishing vessels or a brand of sailboats.
Billy Joel composed a song called "The Downeaster Alexa", describing the ship as a power fishing vessel.

See also
 Great Republic
 Clipper ships

References

Further reading
 

Age of Sail merchant ships of the United States
Merchant ships of the United States
Merchant sailing ship types
Clippers
Tall ships